Aleš Hruška (born 23 November 1985) is a Czech football goalkeeper. He was 1. FK Příbram captain.

International career
In May 2011 he received his first call-up for the Czech national football team. He was called up again in May 2015 for a friendly against Iceland.

References

External links
 
 
 

1985 births
Czech footballers
Association football goalkeepers
Czech First League players
1. FK Příbram players
Living people
FK Viktoria Žižkov players
FC Viktoria Plzeň players
FK Mladá Boleslav players
People from Městec Králové
Czech Republic youth international footballers
Sportspeople from the Central Bohemian Region